The Revenue Act or Wilson-Gorman Tariff of 1894 (ch. 349, §73, August 27, 1894) slightly reduced the  United States tariff rates from the numbers set in the 1890 McKinley tariff and imposed a 2% tax on income over $4,000. It is named for William L. Wilson, Representative from West Virginia, chair of the U.S. House Ways and Means Committee, and Senator Arthur P. Gorman of Maryland, both Democrats.

Supported by pro-free trade members of the Democratic Party, this attempt at tariff reform imposed the first peacetime income tax (2% on income over $4,000, or $88,100 in 2010 dollars, which meant fewer than 1% of households would pay any). The purpose of the income tax was to make up for revenue that would be lost by tariff reductions. The democrats under the Grover Cleveland administration wanted to move away from the protectionism proposed by the McKinley tariff while Cleveland was still in office. By coincidence, $4,000 ($88,100 in 2010 dollars) would be the exemption for married couples when the Revenue Act of (October) 1913 was signed into law by President Woodrow Wilson, as a result of the ratification of the 16th Amendment to the U.S. Constitution in February 1913.

The bill introduced by Wilson and passed by the House significantly lowered tariff rates, in accordance with Democratic platform promises, and dropped the tariff to zero on iron ore, coal, lumber and wool, which angered American producers.  With Senator Gorman operating behind the scenes, protectionists in the Senate added more than 600 amendments that nullified most of the reforms and raised rates again.  The "Sugar Trust" in particular made changes that favored itself at the expense of the foreign competitors.

President Grover Cleveland, who had campaigned on lowering the tariff and supported Wilson's version of the bill, was devastated that his program had been ruined.  He denounced the revised measure as a disgraceful product of "party perfidy and party dishonor," but still allowed it to become law without his signature, believing that it was better than nothing and was at the least an improvement over the McKinley tariff.

The Wilson-Gorman Tariff attracted much opposition in West Texas, where sheepraisers opposed the measure. A Republican, George H. Noonan, was elected to Congress from the district stretching from San Angelo to San Antonio but only for a single term. Among Noonan's backers was a former slave, George B. Jackson, a businessman in San Angelo often called "the wealthiest black man in Texas" in the late 19th century.

Income Tax Amendment
The New York Times reported that many Democrats in the East "prefer to take the income tax, odious as it is, and unpopular as it is bound to be with their constituents" to defeating the Wilson tariff bill. Democratic Representative Johnson of Ohio supported the income tax as the lesser of two evils:
"he was for an income tax as against a tariff tax; but he believed, that it was un-Democratic, inquisitorial, and wrong in principle."

Legacy
The income tax provision was struck down in 1895 by the U.S. Supreme Court case Pollock v. Farmers' Loan & Trust Co., .  In 1913, the 16th Amendment permitted a federal income tax.

The tariff provisions of Wilson-Gorman were superseded by the Dingley Tariff of 1897.

References

Further reading

 Taussig, Frank. Tariff History of the United States (1910) online

External links
Harper's Weekly

1894 in American law
United States federal taxation legislation
United States federal trade legislation
August 1894 events